

Set list

.

Cher